Callow may refer to:

Places
County Carlow, Republic of Ireland
Callow, Derbyshire
Callow, Herefordshire
Callow, Shropshire
Callow Hill, Worcestershire
Callow End, Worcestershire
Callow, County Fermanagh, a townland in County Fermanagh, Northern Ireland
Shannon Callows, an area of flood-prone land along the River Shannon in Ireland

Other uses
Callow (surname)
Callow, in biology, an arthropod that has just undergone ecdysis 
Callow (band), a duo based in the San Francisco Bay Area